Aksalur is a village in the Amasya District, Amasya Province, Turkey. Its population is 523 (2021).

Geography
The village lies to the south of Kayabaşı and northeast of Musaköy,  by road south of the district capital of Amasya.

Demographics
In 2012 the village had a population of 589 people. It has a declining population. In 1985 it had 860 people, and in 2000 it had 760.

References

Villages in Amasya District